Austin Hamilton (born 29 July 1997) is a Swedish male track and field sprinter who competes mainly in the 100 metres. He was a bronze medallist in the 60 metres at the 2017 European Athletics Indoor Championships and represented his country at the 2016 European Athletics Championships in the 4 × 100 metres relay.

A member of Malmö AI club, Hamilton was born in Jamaica and moved to Sweden at the age of nine. He set a Swedish junior record of 10.40 seconds for the 100 metres.

International competitions

Personal bests
60 metres – 6.63 (2017)
100 metres – 10.39 (2019)
200 metres – 21.37 (2015)

All info from All-Athletics profile.

References

External links

Living people
1997 births
Swedish male sprinters
Jamaican male sprinters
Swedish people of Jamaican descent
Jamaican emigrants to Sweden